Hazelhatch and Celbridge railway station serves the area around Hazelhatch in South Dublin and the large town of Celbridge in neighbouring County Kildare, Ireland. Because of its distance from Celbridge town (2.4 km / 1½ miles south of the town centre), a feeder bus is provided to transport people to and from the station. The county boundary between Dublin and Kildare runs directly through the station.

History
The station opened on 4 August 1846 and closed for goods traffic on 9 June 1947.

The station won an award, sponsored by London Underground, at the 2009 National Railway Heritage Awards in London, UK, for the successful adaptation of a heritage structure to include accessibility.

Description

The station has four through platforms and one terminal platform like in Adamstown. Unlike Adamstown, the terminal platform is used. Platforms 1 and 5 are fast line platforms and are not served by regular scheduled trains and are passed through by express services. However, they do get used in exclusive circumstances, such as points failures. Platforms 2 and 4 are slow line platforms and are traditionally used by South Western Commuter and Galway (at peak times) and Waterford Plunkett InterCity services to and from Dublin Heuston in Dublin city centre. Platform 3 is a terminal platform which is served by terminating services from Grand Canal Dock via the Phoenix Park Tunnel.

See also

 List of railway stations in Ireland

References

External links
Irish Rail Hazelhatch and Celbridge Station Website

Iarnród Éireann stations in County Kildare
Iarnród Éireann stations in South Dublin (county)
Railway stations opened in 1846
1846 establishments in Ireland
Railway stations in the Republic of Ireland opened in 1846